Diab al-Mashi (1915 – 11 August 2009) was a member of the parliament of Syria, for the district of Manbij, Aleppo. He won his first term in the 1954 parliamentary elections, and has served continuously until his death. With 55 years of service, he is considered one of the longest-serving members of parliament ever.

References

People from Aleppo Governorate
Members of the People's Assembly of Syria
1915 births
2009 deaths
People's Party (Syria) politicians
Arab Socialist Ba'ath Party – Syria Region politicians
20th-century Syrian politicians
21st-century Syrian politicians